The Destruction of Psara (in) was the killing of thousands of Greeks on the island of Psara by Ottoman troops during the Greek War of Independence in 1824.

Background 
By the beginning of the 19th century, Psara had the third largest trade fleet in Greece after Hydra and Spetses, numbering some 45 ships.

In March 1821, the Greek population revolted against the Ottoman Empire. The inhabitants of Psara joined the struggle on 10 April 1821. Future Prime Minister Konstantinos Kanaris, Dimitrios Papanikolis, Pipinos and Nikolis Apostolis distinguished themselves as naval leaders, using fire ships to combat the more powerful Ottoman Navy.

In April 1822, Turkish forces under the command of Nasuhzade Ali Pasha, Kapudan Pasha of the Ottoman fleet massacred the inhabitants of Chios. Psara's native population of 7,500 people was augmented by  Greek refugees from Chios, but also from Thessaly, Macedonia, Moschonisia and Kydonies.

On the night of 6–7 June 1822, the Greeks responded by destroying the flagship of Nasuhzade Ali Pasha in revenge for the Chios massacre, killing  Turks, as well as the Kapudan Pasha himself.

Massacre 

On 20 June 1824, the island was invaded by the Ottomans under the command of Kapudan Pasha Koca Hüsrev Mehmed.
 The resistance of the Psariots ended the next day with a last stand at the town's old fort of Palaiokastro (alternative name Mavri Rachi, literally "Black Ridge"). Hundreds of soldiers and also women and children had taken refuge there when an Ottoman force of  stormed the fort. The refugees first threw a white flag with the words "Freedom or Death" (Greek: "Ἐλευθερία ἤ Θάνατος"). Then, the moment the Turks entered the fort, the local Antonios Vratsanos lit a fuse to the gunpowder stock, in an explosion that killed the town's inhabitants along with their enemies — thus remaining faithful to their flag up to their death. A French officer who heard and saw the explosion compared it to a volcanic eruption of Mount Vesuvius.

As a result of the invasion,  Greeks were killed or sold as slaves. Part of the population managed to flee the island, scattered through what is now Southern Greece. Theophilos Kairis, a priest and scholar, took on many of the orphaned children and developed the famous school the Orphanotropheio of Theophilos Kairis. Psara was deserted and remained in the hands of the Ottomans until it was recaptured by the Greek navy on 21 October 1912 during the First Balkan War. Since the massacre, the population of the island never rose over  inhabitants.

Reaction and commemoration 
The destruction of Psara by the Ottomans was conducted in retaliation for the destruction of Turkish ships by revolutionaries Konstantinos Kanaris and Dimitrios Papanikolis. It inspired poet Andreas Kalvos to write the ode "To Psara" (Greek: "Εἰς Ψαρά"). 

The event also inspired poet Dionysios Solomos, author of "Hymn to Liberty", to write a poem (or epigram) titled "The Destruction of Psara" (Greek: "Ἡ καταστροφὴ τῶν Ψαρῶν") in 1825:

Στῶν Ψαρῶν τὴν ὁλόμαυρη ράχη
Περπατῶντας ἡ Δόξα μονάχη.
Μελετᾷ τὰ λαμπρὰ παλληκάρια,
Καὶ 'ς τὴν κόμη στεφάνι φορεῖ
Γινομένο ἀπὸ λίγα χορτάρια
Ποῦ εἰχαν μείνῃ 'ς τὴν ἔρημη γῆ.

Διονύσιος Σολωμός
Ἡ καταστροφὴ τῶν Ψαρῶν

On the all-black ridge of Psara
Glory walks by herself taking in
the bright young men on the war field
the crown of her hair wound
from the last few grasses left
on the desolate earth.

Dionysios Solomos
The Destruction of Psara

Gallery 
The destruction of Psara inspired Greek painter Nikolaos Gyzis to produce "The Glory of Psara" (Greek: "Η Δόξα των Ψαρών", pastel on paper), "After the destruction of Psara" (Greek: "Μετά την καταστροφή των Ψαρών", oil on canvas) and "The Glory of Psara" ("Η Δόξα των Ψαρών", oil on canvas):

See also 
 Massacres during the Greek Revolution
 Greek War of Independence
 Chios massacre
 List of massacres in Greece
 Siege of Masada (a similar heroic mass suicide in Jewish history)

References

Sources 
 
 
 
  At the Anemi digital library.

External links 

 

1824 in Greece
Massacres during the Greek War of Independence
Amphibious operations
Psara
Psara
Massacres committed by the Ottoman Empire
Massacres in Greece
Massacres in the Ottoman Empire
Ottoman Psara
Persecution of Greeks in the Ottoman Empire before the 20th century
Psara
Psara